J.T. Cheeseman Provincial Park, is a provincial park located near Channel-Port aux Basques, Newfoundland and Labrador.  

J.T. Cheeseman Provincial Park is named after businessman and politician John T. Cheeseman.

See also
List of Newfoundland and Labrador parks
List of Canadian provincial parks

External links
J.T. Cheeseman Provincial Park, Newfoundland Provincial Parks website

Provincial parks of Newfoundland and Labrador